Philana Marie Boles (born in Toledo, Ohio) is the author of the young adult novel Glitz, the 'tween novel Little Divas, and the adult novels Blame It on Eve and In the Paint . She currently lives in The Hamptons, a suburb of New York City.

Education and background
After graduating from St. Ursula Academy (Toledo, Ohio) in 1994; Boles studied creative writing and theatre at Bowling Green State University.

A native of Toledo, Ohio, Boles has also lived in Bowling Green, Ohio; New York City, and Howard Beach, Queens. She has worked for Glamour (magazine), Spike Lee's Brooklyn based 40 Acres & A Mule Filmworks, the Toledo Free Press, and as a long-term substitute teacher for public and community schools.

Reception 
After writing Little Divas, Boles was compared by critics to Judy Blume and Phyllis Reynolds Naylor. Sybil Wilkes, of the nationally syndicated Tom Joyner Morning Show, twice featured Little Divas as a recommended book for youth.

References

Articles featuring Philana Marie Boles:
Interview with "The Brown Bookshelf"
Backstory interview on "Little Divas" with MJ Rose
"Sormag" blog interview
News article for "In the Paint"
News article for "Blame It on Eve"

External links
 Website for Philana Marie Boles
 Boles' blog, "The Love Spot"

American children's writers
People from Bowling Green, Ohio
People from Howard Beach, Queens
Bowling Green State University alumni
Year of birth missing (living people)